GujjuBhai - Most Wanted is a 2018 Indian Gujarati comedy film directed by Ishaan Randeria. This is the second film in Gujjubhai film series and sequel to Gujjubhai the Great (2015). It stars Siddharth Randeria and Jimit Trivedi in the lead roles. The film opened on 23 February 2018 to generally positive reviews.

Plot 

The film starts with Arvind and his son Khagesh planning a way to get rich. They plan a fake construction project and invite fake sellers to collect money from an unsuspecting buyer called Nagda. However, Nagda discovers the plan and calls debt collectors to empty Arvind’s house as a lien. They find out that their uncle, Bhupat, is dying and want to give his property to them. The property can pay off the debt. However they need to travel to get Buhpat’s signature before getting the house.

On the way to his house, they lose their suitcase on the highway. They run over a secret agent called Vikrant who is going to attend a meeting with terrorists Shahrukh and Farooq. The terrorists were going to give the agent a briefcase that could be used to plot against India. Arvind goes with his family to the hotel which the agent had booked, where he meets another secret agent, Priya. When Vikrant wakes up, he decides to involve Arvind and Kagesh in his plan despite their low intelligence. They both agree that they will exchange the terrorists briefcase with Avrvind’s suitcase.

The plan goes awry as the Indian military ambush them and suspect them of being terrorists. The duo end up getting chained to the briefcase, which ends up being a bomb, and have to test their ‘loyalty’ to the terrorist before they reveal their plans. They end up discarding the bomb, but end up getting trapped in a terrorist camp. The leader of the organization is revealed to be the Pakistan Defense minister, Parvez Mukhtar. They then find out that Vikrant was actually a terrorist all along. They are left to die, but somehow manage to flee from there. In a function, Khagesh finds out that the terrorists have planted a bomb to kill the Pakistan PM, instead of the Indian PM like Arvind had originally thought. Khagesh and Arvind manage to get rid of the bomb and save the lives of both prime ministers. Kagesh and Arvind  both get medals of honor from the Indian Prime Minister.

Cast
 Siddharth Randeria as Arvind Divetia
 Jimit Trivedi as Khagesh Divetia (KD)
 Jayesh More as Agent Vikrant Waghmare
 Tejal Vyas as Indu (Wife of Arvind)
 Purvi Vyas as Chandrika (Mother-in-law of Arvind)
 Vyoma Nandi as Priya Rajguru
 Sunil Vishrani as Nagda
 RagiJani as police inspector Zoravarsinh Jadeja
 Anil Mange as Terrorist Faruqq
 Alok Gagdekar
 Shafique Ansari
 Firoz Irani (Special Guest Appearance)

Production
Pen India Pvt Ltd entered the Gujarati cinema by producing the film.

Ishaan Randeria, son of Siddarth Randeria, wrote the story, screenplay and directed the film. The film also stars Siddarth Randeria and Jimit Trivedi as father and son. The film was shot in Ahmedabad in February 2017. Some parts of the film was shot in Bhujia Fort in Bhuj, Kutch.

Soundtrack
Advait Nemlekar, Parth Bharat Thakkar, Sagar Desai directed the music and lyrics are written by Niren Bhatt. The first song of the film, "Sar Sar Ke" by Aditya Gadhvi and Riya Shah was released on YouTube on 2 January 2016.

Release
The film was initially slated for release on 19 January 2018 but was delayed to 23 February 2018 to avoid clash with Padmaavat and Pad Man.

Reception
The film was opened to positive reviews. Cinemawalla of Desh Gujarat praised the performances and production but criticised the story and length. Shruti Jambekar of The Times of India rated it four out of five and praised the comedy and dialogues. Shubham Dwivedi of NewsFolo criticised the film for its story and gags.

In first two weeks, the film collected  10 crore on the box office.

References

External links
 

2018 films
Films shot in Ahmedabad
Films shot in Gujarat
2018 comedy films
Indian comedy films
Indian sequel films
Films shot in Dubai
India–Pakistan relations in popular culture
2010s Gujarati-language films